HBasic is an integrated development environment used to create, execute and debug programs with a Basic language. HBasic has object-oriented features either in combination with precompiled C++ components (shared libraries) or class definitions (HBasic sourcecode). This also includes a version of inheritance.

Hbasic is a mature Basic implementation for the Linux operating system. HBasic is released under the GNU General Public Licence.

HBASIC is also the name for a BASIC interpreter created specifically for use with the Hercules Graphics Card.

Similar projects
 Gambas
 Visual Basic
 QBasic
 Liberty BASIC

External links

HBasic Development project page

BASIC programming language family
Free compilers and interpreters
Free integrated development environments
Linux integrated development environments
User interface builders
Software that uses Qt